Beardy River, a perennial river that is part of the Murray–Darling basin, is located in the New England region of  New South Wales, Australia.

Course
The river generally runs south of Torrington State Recreation Area, descending  over its  course.

Wildlife in Beardy River region
The Beardy River region, particularly the Beardy River Hill Catchment Management Authority sub-region, is rich in rare flora and fauna. Endangered plants such as the MacNutt's wattle, velvet wattle and Torrington pea have been found here. The area is also home to endangered birds such as the glossy black-cockatoo, brown treecreeper, swift parrot, square-tailed kite and barking owl. The area also has a few marsupials, including the spotted-tailed quoll, squirrel glider and koala.

Gallery

References

External links

Tributaries of the Darling River